Priscilla Ahn (born Priscilla Natalie Hartranft; March 9, 1984) is an American singer, songwriter and multi-instrumentalist. She released her single "Dream" from her debut album, A Good Day, produced by Joey Waronker for EMI's Blue Note Records, in 2008. After growing up in Pennsylvania and graduating from high school, Ahn moved to Los Angeles, California, adopted her mother's Korean maiden name, and began to pursue a music career.

Ahn has toured with Willie Nelson, Amos Lee (for whom she sang backup vocals), Ray LaMontagne, Devotchka and Joshua Radin. Her collaborative efforts include Tiësto's "I Am Strong", Cary Brothers' "Maps" and Ashtar Command's "The Breakup Song".

Ahn has released several albums, including A Good Day, When You Grow Up, and This Is Where We Are.  She has toured internationally, including tours in Japan, China, Korea and the US.

Early life and beginnings
Priscilla Natalie Hartranft was born in Fort Stewart, Georgia, to Kay (née Ahn) and Harry Hartranft. Her family visited South Korea, where her mother is from, several times. Her parents met when her father was stationed there while in the military.

Ahn spent her childhood growing up in Berks County, Pennsylvania, and attended Tulpehocken Area High School. She started playing guitar and harmonica at the age of 14 and performed in choirs and musical productions throughout high school. After graduation her music professors Charles Eckhart and Douglas Crowder encouraged her to pursue her music career full-time. She soon moved to Los Angeles.

She took her mother's maiden name as her stage name, saying, "Ahn is so much prettier and simpler. It’s also an ode to my Korean background, which is where I get my musical genes from.”

Career

After years of performing at open mic nights, Priscilla Ahn played a showcase in New York City for Blue Note Records and was signed to the label. In 2008, Blue Note Records released her full-length debut album, A Good Day, produced by Joey Waronker. The following June, Ahn went on a national tour. Her album,  A Good Day included musical contributions by keyboardists Greg Kurstin, Keefus Ciancia, guitarist Mike Andrews, musical saw player Ursula Knudsun, cellist and string arranger Oliver Kraus, keyboardist Larry Goldings and singers Jim Gilstrap and Orin Waters.

Priscilla Ahn has toured with Joshua Radin, Amos Lee, Willie Nelson and Ray Lamontagne and contributed vocals to the albums Supply and Demand, Mission Bell and Kaleidoscope. She was selected as Artist of the Week in Paste magazine in June 2008.

Ahn's songs have appeared on the television shows Grey's Anatomy, Knight Rider, Make It Or Break It, Married Single Other, several episodes of the Ghost Whisperer, and in the films Disturbia, Bride Wars, Love Happens, My Sister's Keeper, Free Willy: Escape from Pirate's Cove and Moms' Night Out.

After contributing to the compilations album, His Way, Our Way, Priscilla Ahn collaborated with Inara George, Sia, Eleni Mandell, Charlie Wadhams and Jake Blanton on her album When You Grow Up which was produced by Ethan Johns.

Ahn appeared on The Tonight Show with Jay Leno in May 2011 and ABC's Dancing with the Stars, performing songs from her debut A Good Day and the title track from When You Grow Up.

After a period of writer's block, Ahn isolated herself in a remote desert hotel to create new music for the album This is Where We Are.  "I found the whole thing really inspiring, and suddenly, all these songs came pouring out.  I just needed a little isolation and focus, some new sounds to play with, and a carefree, 'this is just an experiment' attitude to begin writing again." This Is Where We Are was released in Japan on 19 July 2013 and later in Korea and Taiwan and was released in the US on 15 February 2014.

She also composed and performed music for the nationally successful Ghibli film in 2014: When Marnie Was There directed by Hiromasa Yonebayashi including the soundtrack in the credit sequence Fine on the Outside, as well as 9 other songs based on the film which were published in an album When Marnie Was There Song Album - Just Know That I Love You.

Ahn's music is described as grounded in folk, country, and pop.
Ahn explored electropop music in the album This Is Where We Are. Of the album's stylistic departure, she said, " I like to let things naturally flow out when I’m writing, and be whatever they’ll be. I think the biggest reason why this album ended up sounding so different from my previous two is because I wrote most of these songs on a keyboard, instead of my guitar. I bought a keyboard, learned how to use Logic Pro, and used their basic audio samples as a songwriting tool. It opened up a whole new world to me sonically, and all these new songs just came pouring out."

Personal life
Ahn married actor Michael Weston in May 2010. They have 2 children.

Discography

Albums

EPs
 Priscilla Ahn (2007, self-released)
 Live Session (2008, iTunes)
 In A Tree (2009)
 Sweet Hearts (2012, With Charlie Wadhams)
 Waiting (2021)

Singles
"Dream" (2008, Blue Note)
"I'll Never Smile Again" (2009)
"I Am Strong" by Tiësto featuring vocals by Priscilla Ahn (2009)
"Where The Leaf Starts To Fall" featuring Taiwanese music band Sodagreen (2013)
"從一片落葉開始 (It Began With A Fallen Leaf)" by Sodagreen featuring vocals by Priscilla Ahn (2013)

Music videos
"Dream"
"Red Cape"
"Vibe So Hot"
"I Don't Have Time To Love"
"When You Grow Up"
"Torch Song"
"Home"
"Remember How I Broke Your Heart"
"Leave It Open"

Compilation appearances
His Way, Our Way (Sinatra Tribute)
The Hotel Café presents Winter Songs- Silent Night  featured on ER

Contributions
Vocals and Piano on Joshua Radin's We Were Here, Columbia, 2006 (as Priscilla Hartranft)
Vocals on Amos Lee's Supply and Demand, Blue Note Records, 2006
Vocals on Joshua Radin's EP Unclear Sky: "The Fear You Won't Fall", 2006
Vocals on Joshua Radin's Underwater: "Let It Go", "The Greenest Grass", 2012.
Vocals on William Fitzsimmons' The Sparrow and the Crow, Mercer Street, 2008
Vocals on Cary Brothers' Vol. 1 EP  Maps, 2012
Vocals on Ashtar Command American Sunshine: "The Breakup Song", "Rosa", "All the Stars in Heaven", 2011
Vocals on TV on the Radio's Nine Types of Light: "Will Do", 2011
Vocals on Amos Lee's Mission Bell: "Stay With Me", 2011

Filmography
Credits of Priscilla Ahn as a vocalist and/or songwriter

Television
Credits of Priscilla Ahn as a vocalist and/or songwriter

2009: Men in Trees – Leave the Light On (Warner Bros. Television)
2009: Grey's Anatomy – Dream (ABC Studios)
2009: Psych – A Good Day (Morning Song) (NBC Studios, Inc.)
2009: Knight Rider-I Don't Think So (NBC Studios, Inc)
2009: Ghost Whisperer – Dream (ABC Studios)
2009: Eli Stone – Dream (ABC Studios)
2009: ER Promos – Silent Night (NBC Studios, Inc)
2010: Jeep Wrangler "We Build" – In a Tree (commercials – BBDO)
2010: So You Think You Can Dance – Dream (DanceNation Productions, Inc.)
2010: Life – Dream (NBC Universal Television)
2010: The Biggest Loser – Red Cape (BL4 Productions, Inc)
2010: Brothers And Sisters – Dream (ABC Studios)
2010: Grey's Anatomy – Christmas Time Is Here (American Broadcasting Company)
2010: Kansai Electric Power – Leave The Light On (EMI Music Japan)
2011: So You Think You Can Dance Season 7 – Dream (Dick Clark Productions, Inc.)
2011: Psych – Christmas Time Is Here (GEP)
2011: Kansai Electric Power – Leave The Light On (EMI Japan)
2011: "Married, Single, Other" BBC – Find My Way Back Home (EMI UK)
2011: "Married, Single, Other" ITV – Find My Way Back Home (EMI UK)
2012: ABC Family: Make It or Break It – Dream (ABC Studios)
2012: United States: In Plain Sight – Season 4 – Wallflower (NBC Universal Television Music)
2012: WB: Men in Trees (ET Upgrade) – Leave The Light On (Warner Bros. Television)
2012: RIS – Dream (EMI Music France)
2012: NHK: Soko wo Nantoka – I'll Be Here (EMI Music Japan)
2014: NHK: Soko wo Nantoka 2 – Best I can ベスト・アイ・キャン (Universal Music Japan)

Television appearances
2008: The Tonight Show with Jay Leno – (Ep. 16.107 – NBC Studios)
2008: The Late Late Show with Craig Ferguson – (Ep. 5.1 – CBS)
2009: Later with Jools Holland – (Ep. 34.4 – BBC)
2011: The Tonight Show with Jay Leno – (Ep. 19.140 – NBC Studios)
2011: Dancing with the Stars – (Ep. 12.13 – CBS)

References

External links
 Official website

1984 births
Living people
American musicians of Korean descent
American women singer-songwriters
American acoustic guitarists
Singer-songwriters from Pennsylvania
People from Berks County, Pennsylvania
Guitarists from Pennsylvania
21st-century American women singers
21st-century American singers
21st-century American women guitarists
21st-century American guitarists
Guitarists from Georgia (U.S. state)
American banjoists
American singers of Asian descent
American folk singers
American autoharp players
American keyboardists
American pianists
21st-century American pianists
Singer-songwriters from Georgia (U.S. state)
21st-century women pianists